Acacia subflexuosa is a shrub of the genus Acacia and the subgenus Plurinerves that is endemic to an area of south western Australia.

Description
Like most species of Acacia it has phyllodes rather than true leaves. It blooms from August to September and produces yellow flowers. The simple inflorescences occur singly or in pairs in the axils and have spherical flower-heads with a diameter of  containing 15 to 22 golden coloured flowers.

Taxonomy
There are two recognised subspecies:
 Acacia subflexuosa subsp. capillata
 Acacia subflexuosa subsp. subflexuosa

Distribution
It is native to an area in the Wheatbelt regions of Western Australia where it is commonly situated on ridge, hills and undulating plains growing in sandy or clay-loam soils often over or around granite or laterite. The range of the plant extends from around Toodyay in the west to around Cunderdin in the east and as far south as the Dryandra Woodland with disjunct populations found near Lake King as a part of jarrah or wandoo or mallee woodland or scrubland communities.

See also
 List of Acacia species

References

subflexuosa
Acacias of Western Australia
Taxa named by Joseph Maiden
Plants described in 1920